Joel Abbot (March 17, 1776 – November 19, 1826) was a United States representative from Georgia. He practiced as a physician.

Early years 
Abbot was born in Ridgefield, Connecticut on March 17, 1776. After studying at an academy and at a medical school he moved to Washington, Georgia, in 1794 and practiced medicine.

Career 
He was a member of the Washington, Georgia city council. He also served as a member of the Georgia House of Representatives, 1799, 1802–1804, 1808, and 1811. He was elected as a Republican to the 15th United States Congress and was reelected as a Republican to the two succeeding Congresses (16th and 17th), Abbott then successfully ran for reelection as a Crawford Republican to the 18th Congress and his congressional service spanned from March 4, 1817, to March 3, 1825.

Last years 
After his congressional service, Abbott returned to the practice of medicine. He was also a delegate to the convention in Philadelphia, Pennsylvania to prepare the first National Pharmacopoeia. He died on November 19, 1826, in Lexington, Georgia, and was buried in Rest Haven Cemetery in Washington, Georgia.

References

1776 births
1826 deaths
People from Ridgefield, Connecticut
People of colonial Connecticut
Democratic-Republican Party members of the United States House of Representatives from Georgia (U.S. state)
Members of the Georgia House of Representatives
People from Washington, Georgia
Physicians from Georgia (U.S. state)
Burials in Georgia (U.S. state)